Western Command can refer to one of the following:
Western Command (Australia)
Western Command (India)
Western Command (Philippines)
Western Command (United Kingdom)
Western Command (United States)